Class 701 may refer to:

British Rail Class 701
Nanshui 701-class water tanker